S.B.E.S. College of Science, is an undergraduate and postgraduate, coeducational college situated in Sambhaji Nagar, Maharashtra. It was established in the year 1963. The college is affiliated with Dr. Babasaheb Ambedkar Marathwada University. This college offers different degree courses in science.

Departments

Science
Physics
Mathematics
Chemistry
Statistics
Electronics
Botany
Environmental Science
Zoology
Computer Science

Accreditation
The college is  recognized by the University Grants Commission (UGC).

References

External links

Dr. Babasaheb Ambedkar Marathwada University
Universities and colleges in Maharashtra
Educational institutions established in 1963
1963 establishments in Maharashtra